The 27th TVyNovelas Awards is an Academy of special awards to the best soap operas and TV shows. The awards ceremony took place on March 15, 2009 in the Forum Mundo Imperial, Acapulco, Guerrero. The ceremony was televised in Mexico by Canal de las estrellas.

Yuri hosted the show. Alma de hierro won 8 awards, the most for the evening. Other winners Fuego en la sangre won 4 awards, including Best Telenovela, and Cuidado con el ángel and Las tontas no van al cielo won 2 awards each.

Summary of awards and nominations

Winners and nominees

Novelas

Others

Special Awards
Special Award for his Career: Luís de Llano Palmer

Performers

Missing
People who did not attend ceremony wing and were nominated in the shortlist in each category:
Juan Soler

References 

TVyNovelas Awards
TVyNovelas Awards
TVyNovelas Awards
TVyNovelas Awards ceremonies